The 1960 United States Grand Prix was a Formula One motor race held on November 20, 1960, at Riverside International Raceway in Riverside, California. It was race 10 of 10 in the 1960 World Championship of Drivers and race 9 of 9 in the 1960 International Cup for Formula One Manufacturers.

Summary
For whatever reason (unfamiliarity of the fans with open-wheeled cars and European drivers; media disapproval of Eastern promoters; lack of an ongoing championship battle), promoter Alec Ulmann had no more success drumming up support for the 1960 United States Grand Prix at Riverside International Raceway in California than he had the year before in Sebring, Florida.

Set in the desert near the Box Spring Mountain complex east of Los Angeles, the Riverside track featured a particularly demanding uphill esses section, just past the start-finish line. Riverside resident and local hero Dan Gurney headed the field as the natural favorite of the crowd, which numbered only about 25,000. Jack Brabham, who had already clinched his second consecutive World Championship a few weeks prior in Portugal, was back with teammate Bruce McLaren in the factory Cooper-Climaxes. Team Lotus had cars for Jim Clark, Innes Ireland and John Surtees, while Rob Walker entered a Scottish blue Lotus for Stirling Moss. BRM had three mid-engined P48s for Jo Bonnier, Graham Hill and Gurney.

With the Championship chase over, Enzo Ferrari decided to keep his cars at home, believing his time and money would be better spent preparing for the new 1.5-liter Formula for 1961. The team's drivers, Phil Hill and Wolfgang von Trips, however, were allowed to enter the race with other teams. Hill particularly wanted to protect his third-place position in the Championship behind Cooper teammates Brabham and McLaren.

Moss won the pole battle, well ahead of Brabham and Gurney, who completed the front row. Phil Hill was astonished at the "incredible" difference in handling between the year-old, rear-engined green and red Cooper he was given for the race and the Monza winning Dino Ferrari he had been driving all season, but he managed to put it only thirteenth on the grid.

On his way to the track in nearly perfect weather on Sunday morning, race promoter Ulmann realized that, indeed, he had bitten the hand that might have fed him. Following the rousing success of the Los Angeles Times-sponsored Sports Car Grand Prix that summer, where a crowd of 70,000 packed RIR, Ulmann said plainly that a genuine Formula One Grand Prix would surely do even better, since the Times race wasn't really a Grand Prix at all!

Ulmann's words angered Times publisher Otis Chandler, and only Ulmann was surprised when the biggest daily paper in Los Angeles and most of the local media completely ignored the event.

The small crowd of Riverside veterans who were on hand for the race, however, were stunned by the spectacle of the F1 cars. As Brabham took the early lead into Turn One, ahead of Gurney and Moss, the Riverside radio and PA announcer could only call their names and utter, "Wow." The Coopers of Phil Hill and Olivier Gendebien stalled on the grid, but were restarted and got under way. On lap 4, Surtees spun his Lotus in front of teammate Jim Clark, putting himself out, and causing the nosecone from his car to be used to replace the now-shattered one on Clark's.

Still leading, Brabham paid the price for over-reacting to last year's sputtering last lap at Sebring. Not wanting to run out of fuel again, he had overfilled his tanks, and excess fuel was spilling and being ignited by the heat of his exhaust. Two stops failed to find the source of the problem, or to assuage Brabham's concern over the noises and flames erupting from the back of the car.

The Australian's troubles left Moss well in front, and when Gurney's BRM blew a core plug, Moss' teammate Bonnier took second, ahead of Ireland, Graham Hill and Texan Jim Hall, driving his first Grand Prix. Just before halfway through the 75-lap race, Graham Hill retired with a broken gearbox, and Bonnier began to drop back when a broken valve spring caused a misfire. Brabham had been charging up through the field since his pit stops, however, and eventually finished a battling fourth, behind teammate McLaren. Phil Hill ran fifth in the unfamiliar Cooper until a spin dropped him behind Bonnier, who got his ailing BRM home for two points.

Moss won the last race of the two-and-a-half liter era going away, and grabbed third in the Championship for the second year in a row. It was his fourteenth victory under the outgoing regulations, one less than five-time World Champion Juan Manuel Fangio.

Having failed to realize his dream for Formula One in the US a second time, Ulmann  nobly used his own money to pay prize and appearance fees. Winner Moss got a check for $7,500, a staggering amount for the time, and while suppliers had to wait a few months for theirs, they received every penny. Happily, the following year would see the United States Grand Prix finally settle into a regular home, with a loyal and appreciative crowd in Watkins Glen, New York. But a Formula One race would eventually return to California. In 1976, the United States Grand Prix West would come to Long Beach, only 60 miles away.

Classification

Qualifying

Race

Championship standings after the race

Drivers' Championship standings

Constructors' Championship standings

 Notes: Only the top five positions are included for both sets of standings. Only the best 6 results counted towards each Championship. Numbers without parentheses are Championship points; numbers in parentheses are total points scored.

References

External links
 
 Dennis Shattuck (February, 1961). "Grand Prix of the U.S.". Road & Track, 78-81.

1960 Formula One races
1960
Sports in Riverside, California
1960 in sports in California
History of Riverside, California
1960 in American motorsport
November 1960 sports events in the United States